Peel Hall may refer to:

Peel Hall, Cheshire, a country house in Cheshire
Peel Hall, Wythenshawe, an area of Greater Manchester

Architectural disambiguation pages